Most of the county routes in Erie County, New York, act as primary roads in the less developed areas and also serve to interconnect the various villages and hamlets of the county. Not all routes are signed. All routes are maintained by the Erie County Department of Public Works, Division of Highways. The area has over 300 routes, due to the urbanizing of Erie County. Routes 250 through 511 all run in a general northeast–southwest pattern. No other patterns exist in Erie County.

Routes 1-100

Routes 101-200

Routes 201-300

Routes 301-400

Routes 401-500

Routes 501 and up

See also 

 County routes in New York

References

External links 

 Erie County Highways – Empire State Roads.com